Macraspis festiva is a species of beetles in the family Scarabaeidae.

References

Scarabaeidae
Beetles described in 1844